The Hasinai Confederacy was a large confederation of Caddo-speaking Native Americans who occupied territory between the Sabine and Trinity rivers in eastern Texas. Today, their descendants are enrolled in the Caddo Nation of Oklahoma and the Natchitoches Tribe of Louisiana.

Name
The name Hasinai (with the variants Hasini, Asenai, Asinai, Assoni, Asenay, Cenis, Senis, and Sannaye) means "our own people" in Caddoan. The Spanish knew the Hasinai as the Tejas or Texas, from a form of greeting meaning "friend", which gave the state of Texas its name.

Government
When the Spanish and the French encountered the Hasinai in the 1680s, they were a centrally organized chiefdom under the control of a religious leader, known as the Grand Xinesi. He lived in a secluded house and met with a council of elders. 

The chieftainship consisted of several subdivisions, which have been designated "cantonments".  Each was under the control of a Caddi.  There were also men designated as Canahas and Chayas, who helped the Caddi run the system.

History

During the 17th century, the Hasinai traded with the Jumano at the western Hasinai city of Nabedache. Some consider the residents of Nabedache to have been a distinct people designated by that name.

Historic populations
It is estimated that in 1520, the people who would become the Hasinai, the Kadohadacho and the Natchitoches, numbered about 250,000. Over the next 250 years, the population of these Caddoan-speaking peoples was severely reduced by epidemics of endemic diseases carried by Spanish and French colonists and spread through indigenous trading networks. Native Americans had no acquired immunity to the new diseases, and suffered high mortality.

In 1690, the Hasinai numbered in the vicinity of 10,000 people or a little more. By 1720, as a result of infectious diseases such as smallpox, the Hasinai population had fallen to 2,000.

Closely related peoples
 Arikara
 Chitimacha
 Kadohadacho
 Natchitoches
 Pawnee
 Tula

See also 
 Caddoan Mississippian culture
 Caddo
 Caddo language
 Yowani Choctaw
El Camino Real de los Tejas National Historic Trail

Notes

References
 Edmonds, Randlett. Nusht'uhtiʔtiʔ Hasinay: Caddo Phrasebook. Richardson, TX: Various Indian Peoples Publishing, 2003. .

External links
 The Hasinai Society of the Caddo Nation 
 Encyclopedia of Oklahoma History and Culture — The Hasinai
 Tides.sfasu.ed−Texas Tides: Location of the Tribes of the Hasinai Confederacy in 1716
 Texasbeyondhistory.net:  Life and Times of the Caddo

Caddoan peoples
Native American tribes in Oklahoma
Native American tribes in Texas
Native American history of Texas